Indarbela minima is a moth in the family Cossidae. It is found in Sri Lanka.

References

Natural History Museum Lepidoptera generic names catalog

Metarbelinae
Moths described in 1910
Moths of Sri Lanka